is a Japanese game franchise developed by Cacalia Studio and published by Happy Elements K.K., the Japanese division of the Chinese company Happy Elements. It is a spin-off of the 2012 game Ensemble Girls! It was first released as a life simulation and gacha game on Google Play on April 28, 2015, and on the App Store on May 1, 2015.

On March 9, 2020, Ensemble Stars! was rebranded and relaunched under the title , with the original app split into two games catering to different gameplay styles: Ensemble Stars!! Basic, the original game; and Ensemble Stars!! Music, a rhythm game.

The success of the game led to several stage plays and manga adaptations. An anime television series by David Production aired from July 7 to December 22, 2019.  A theatrical anime premiered on March 4, 2022.

Characters

Main characters

Trickstar

The point-of-view character throughout the Ensemble Stars! main story.

Yumenosaki Private Academy

Fine

Undead

Valkyrie

Knights

Arashi is a member of Knights and is described as an  character, and speaks using feminine speech.

Ryuseitai

Ra*bits

2wink
 and

Akatsuki

MaM

Switch

Shuuetsu Academy

Adam

Reimei Academy

Eve

Ensemble Square

Alkaloid

Crazy:B

Supporting characters

Media

Game
Ensemble Stars! was released for the Android on April 28, 2015, and iOS on May 1, 2015. Shortly after the game's release, in 2015, Sousuke Sōma, who provided the voice for Arashi Narukami, was replaced by Ryo Kitamura, with all voice clips replaced on July 18, 2015; Kitamura would later go on to portray the character in the stage play adaptations. In April 2017, Yoshimasa Hosoya left the franchise due to a medical hiatus, and Happy Elements announced that he would be replaced by Tomoaki Maeno in the role of Hokuto Hidaka, with all his voice clips replaced beginning on May 31, 2017.

On November 9, 2019, Happy Elements announced at the Animate Girls Festival that they would be adding two new groups, Alkaloid and Crazy B. On March 15, 2020, Ensemble Stars! was relaunched and was split into two separate games: Basic, the original game; and Music, a brand new rhythm game; both games offered different gameplay but contained the same events, storylines, and items.

In March 2016, Ensemble Stars! was planned to launch in China in Q2 2016 through Tencent. In February 2018, Ensemble Stars! was launched in South Korea through Kakao Games. On December 24, 2021, an English version of Ensemble Stars!! Music opened pre-registrations for users in the United States, Canada, Australia, and the United Kingdom. Ensemble Stars!! English was then officially launched on June 16, 2022, following an accidental temporary App Store launch in May of the same year.

Manga
A manga adaptation written and illustrated by Ichi Sayo was launched in Kodansha's Shōjo manga magazine Aria on August 28, 2015 and ended on December 28, 2016.

Ensembukubu Stars!, a 4-panel gag parody drawn by Bkub Okawa, is serialized on Ensemble Stars! official Twitter account and Dengeki Online since 2017.

Anime
An anime television series adaptation was announced in December 2015. It was planned to premiere in 2017, but the staff announced they had postponed it in February 2017. The series was produced by David Production aired from July 7 to December 22, 2019, on Tokyo MX, SUN, KBS, TVA, and BS11. Masakazu Hishida was the director under the pseudonym Junpaku Yagurashita. Yasufumi Soejima was the series director, with Shinichi Inotsume as chief writer, and Haruko Iizuka, Tomoyuki Shitaya, and Eri Nagata as character designers. Akira was the scriptwriter, and Tatsuya Kato composed the series' music. Funimation has acquired the series for streaming in North America; the simuldub premiered on August 4, 2019. The anime uses the CACANi 2D animation & in-between software tool.

On September 10, 2022, a new anime project titled  was announced.

Film
The series received a compilation film titled Ensemble Stars!! Road to Show!!, which premiered on March 4, 2022. It featured 10 idol characters already featured in the game (Mao Isara, Makoto Yuuki, Aira Shiratori, Mayoi Ayase, Nagisa Ran, Hinata Aoi, Kohaku Oukawa, Rei Sakuma, Izumi Sena, Ritsu Sakuma) as well as the player character Anzu. It also featured Mitsunari Samejima, a new character specific to the film. Masakazu Hishida directed the film at David Production, with Asami Nakatani serving as chief director, Seitarō Kino writing the scripts, Haruko Iizuka designing the characters and serving as chief animation director, and Tatsuya Katō composing the film's music. In addition, BukuSuta The World, a series of animated shorts based on Bkub Okawa's parody manga Ensembukubu Stars!, were screened in theaters with Road to Show!!

Reception
By March 2016, over 1,500,000 users downloaded the game.

References

External links
 

2019 anime television series debuts
Animated musical groups
David Production
Funimation
Fictional musical groups
Japanese idol video games
Japanese idols in anime and manga
Kodansha manga
Manga based on video games
Shōjo manga
Tokyo MX original programming